Ngũ Phụng is a rural commune of Phú Quý District, Bình Thuận Province, Vietnam.

References

Populated places in Bình Thuận province
District capitals in Vietnam